Radial spoke head protein 6 homolog A (RSPH6A) also known as radial spoke head-like protein 1 (RSHL1) is a protein that in humans is encoded by the RSPH6A gene.

Function 

Radial spoke head protein 6 homolog A is similar to a sea urchin radial spoke head protein. Radial spoke protein complexes form part of the axoneme of eukaryotic flagella and are located between the axoneme's outer ring of doublet microtubules and central pair of microtubules. In Chlamydomonas, radial spoke proteins are thought to regulate the activity of dynein and the symmetry of flagellar bending patterns.

Clinical significance 

The RSPH6A gene maps to a region of chromosome 19 that is linked to primary ciliary dyskinesia-2 (CILD2).

References

Further reading